Sister complex is a state of strong attachment and obsession to sisters. It is commonly abbreviated as "siscon", and in this case, it is also used for brothers and sisters who have a strong attachment and obsession to their sisters.

History
In 1917,  stated in his work Psychoanalysis that Ophelia and Laertes had a "brother-sister complex" relationship. In his 1932 work Psychological Analysis, Kubo called the relationship between father and daughter by sexual instinct "father-daughter complex" and that between mother and son "mother-son complex". He argues that "brother-sister complex" is a transfer of "father-daughter complex" and "mother-son complex".

The word "sister complex" is used in Hiroyuki Itsuki's novel Koiuta, which was serialized from October 12, 1967 to May 11, 1968.

Overview
It is wasei-eigo and was originally a slang term for fetishism, but in analytical psychology, the concept of fetishism and complex is related, so it was generalized by the term complex. If the other party is a brother, it is called a "brother complex".

The sister complex is captured in the scheme of a brother who has "love feelings for sisters" and "exclusive desire to own". For men in the sister complex, older sisters and younger sisters can become idealized images, combined with sexual aspirations, and can have more influence on their lives than their parents. For example, choosing a lover or spouse who has something in common or similar to his sister. On the other hand, it may also be used for the same sex (women who are obsessed with sisters). In this case, it is often seen relatively positively as "a woman who longs for her older sister" and "a woman who loves her younger sister".

Nobuhiko Obayashi described Tezuka as a sister complex type author, citing an episode in which Osamu Tezuka said, "No one was as erotic as my sister sitting next to me and drawing manga." According to Obayashi, sister complex type authors are characterized by the fact that they do not grow roots in the ground, but continue to search for their lost "sister" while jumping out of the earth and going to space or into the future. In addition, they have the characteristic of giving up sex and realizing that they can only love their sister. Obayashi includes among sister complex type authors Akira Kurosawa, Howard Hawks, and Obayashi himself. Yoshihiro Yonezawa cites the sister complex as one of the characteristics of Osamu Tezuka. Shotaro Ishinomori states that he is a sister complex. Naohiro Fumoto quoted the poetries of Ono no Takamura and Ariwara no Narihira, who seemed to be attracted to his sister, and pointed out that they were sister complexes. Fumoto also mentioned that Yukio Mishima had confessed that he loved his sister Mitsuko Hiraoka and wrote works that included incest such as Tropical Tree, described Mishima as a sister complex.

See also
Brother complex
Oedipus complex
Electra complex
Jocasta complex
Father complex
Mother's boy
Incest

References

Complex (psychology)
Sisters
Moe (slang)
Wasei-eigo
Incest